Lindsay Davenport and Corina Morariu were the defending champions, but neither competed this year.

Chanda Rubin and Sandrine Testud won the title by defeating Cara Black and Amy Frazier 6–4, 6–4 in the final.

Seeds

Draw

Draw

References

 Official results archive (ITF)
 Official results archive (WTA)

Doubles
Bank of the West Classic - Doubles